Ding Yu (?–1380), born Ding Guozhen (丁国珍), was a military general during the early Ming dynasty who was executed by Zhu Yuanzhang as part of the Hu Weiyong case. Zhu Yuanzhang executed Ding Yu because he was related to Hu Weiyong by marriage.

Background 
Ding Yu was born in Hezhong (河中) in modern-day Shanxi.

After Lü Zhen (呂珍) attacked Anfeng, Ding Yugui surrendered to Zhu Yuanzhang. After that, he served as the magistrate of Jiujiang and quelled the Pengze rebellion (彭澤叛乱). Zhu Yuanzhang ordered Ding to concurrently serve as a conductor and changed his name to Yu. After that, Ding and Fu Youde conquered Hengzhou (衡州). Ding served as the commander Tongzhi guarding Hengzhou (同知镇守衡州) and then moved to Yongzhou (永州).

In the first year of Hongwu, he was promoted to be the commander-in-chief, taking part in politics in the province and guarding Guangxi. In the 10th year of Hongwu, he was promoted to the right imperial guard (右御史大夫). Later, as a general of Pingqiang, he put down the rebellion of Dong Tieli (董貼里叛乱), a chieftain of Weimaotu, Sichuan. Two years later, Ding pacified Songzhou (松州). At that time, Zhu Yuanzhang thought that Songzhou was mountainous and had few fields, so it was not appropriate to stick to it. Ding Yu believed that it is an important place in Xiqiang (西羌) and that they should not give up the military facilities there. So Zhu Yuanzhang listened to his opinion. 

At that time, Peng Pugui (彭普貴) from Sichuan rebelled, and Puliang (普亮) was not pacified, so Ding Yu was dispatched there. Zhu Yuanzhang then appointed Ding Yu as Zuo Yushi (左御史大夫). After the army returned from Puliang, Ding Yu was promoted to the left governor of the viceroy's office. 

In the 13th year of Hongwu, the Hu Weiyong case occurred, and Hu Weiyong was executed for treason. As Ding Yu was related to Hu Weiyong by marriage, Ding Yu was executed by Zhu Yuanzhang as well.

References

Bibliography
Zhang Tingyu. History of Ming.

1380 deaths
14th-century executions
Executed Ming dynasty people
Executed people from Shanxi
Generals from Shanxi
Ming dynasty generals
Ming dynasty politicians
People executed by the Ming dynasty
Victims of familial execution
Yuan dynasty people
Year of birth unknown